Anela Lubina (born 18 December 1995) is a Croatian footballer who plays as a midfielder and has appeared for the Croatia women's national team.

Career
Lubina has been capped for the Croatia national team, appearing for the team during the 2019 FIFA Women's World Cup qualifying cycle.

References

External links
 
 
 
 

1995 births
Living people
Croatian women's footballers
Croatia women's international footballers
Women's association football midfielders